Alexander Hidalgo Santos (born June 10, 1970), professionally known as Alex Santos, is a Filipino field reporter who is currently hosting for Net 25, news director for DWIZ, and a former newscaster and television host for ABS-CBN and DZMM.

Background

Education
Santos graduated elementary and high school from Holy Cross of Davao College, a private, Catholic institution in Davao City. He earned a Bachelor of Science degree from the Ateneo de Davao University.

Career

Television career

Santos began his career as a television reporter and newsreader with TV Patrol Southern Mindanao (previously known as TV Patrol Mindanao) from 1992 to 1996. He also hosted a local variety show Alas Kwatro of ABS-CBN Davao. In 1996, he transferred to Metro Manila to become a news editor for regional affiliates of ABS-CBN Corporation's Sarimanok News Network (now ANC, the ABS-CBN News Channel), a position he held until 2006.

In 1998, Santos has been started his career as sportscaster and courtside reporter of the newly formed Metropolitan Basketball Association (a regional-professional basketball league), first as a sideline reporter during the MBA's maiden season in 1998, and later as a play-by-play commentator In 1999. The MBA has been produced by ABS-CBN Sports and covered on Studio 23.

At DZMM, he anchored the weekday edition of Radyo Patrol Balita: Alas Kuwatro also with Bernadette Sembrano (replaced Jasmin Romero in 2011) and All Aboard! Pinoy Abroad! with Maresciel Yao.

He began anchoring TV Patrol Weekend alongside Bernadette Sembrano On July 8, 2006, and In 2007 became a presenter on the morning show Umagang Kay Ganda. In 2009 he was one of the co-hosts of the investigative program XXX: Exklusibong, Explosibong, Exposé and was later replaced by Anthony Taberna.

A year after, he left ABS-CBN, now a news director at DWIZ 882 kHz and a news anchor of PTV.

Personal life

He is married to Joanna Gomez-Santos, Vice President for TV Production Operations of ABS-CBN Corporation, and together they have three sons: Juan Alejandro (Juancho), Joaquin Alberto (Joaquin) and Javier Alfonzo (Javi).

Television and radio programs

References

External links
ABS-CBN News and Current Affairs Group

1970 births
Living people
Visayan people
People from Davao City
Filipino television news anchors
Filipino radio journalists
Ateneo de Davao University alumni
ABS-CBN personalities
ABS-CBN News and Current Affairs people